Gregory Jones (born December 3, 1953) is a former World Cup alpine ski racer from the United States.

Born in Tahoe City, California, he specialized in giant slalom. Jones competed in all three events at the 1976 Winter Olympics and finished 9th in the giant slalom, 11th in the downhill, and 19th in the slalom. His all-around performance earned a World Championship bronze medal in the combined event.

Jones won a World Cup race a few weeks later in the United States at Copper Mountain, Colorado. Teammate Phil Mahre was the runner-up for the first-ever one-two finish by U.S. men in a World Cup race.

World Cup Results

Race podiums
 1 win – (1 GS)
 2 podiums – (2 GS)

Season standings

 Points were only awarded for top ten finishes (see scoring system).

World championship results 

From 1948 through 1980, the Winter Olympics were also the World Championships for alpine skiing.

Olympic results

References

External links
 
 Greg Jones World Cup standings at the International Ski Federation
 
 
 Gregory Jones at the U.S. Ski & Snowboard Hall of Fame

1953 births
Living people
American male alpine skiers
Olympic alpine skiers of the United States
Alpine skiers at the 1976 Winter Olympics
People from Olympic Valley, California
20th-century American people